Taroon may refer to:

 Tarun, a given name
 A version of Red Hat Enterprise Linux
 A locality in Victoria, Australia
 A fictional locality in the Star Wars universe